Shamsha Kopbaevna Berkimbayeva (10 October 1942 – 7 April 2022) was a Kazakh academic and politician. She served as Minister of Education and Science from 2002 to 2003. She died on 7 April 2022 at the age of 79.

References

1942 births
2022 deaths
Kazakhstani politicians
Communist Party of the Soviet Union members
Government ministers of Kazakhstan
Recipients of the Order of the Red Banner of Labour
Recipients of the Order of Parasat
Recipients of the Order of Kurmet
People from Almaty Region